Stephen Timothy 'Steve' May (born 29 November 1971) is a former politician from Arizona, where he served in the Arizona House of Representatives. He was openly gay when he ran for and served in the legislature. He was nevertheless recalled to active duty in the military. He came to national attention in 1999 when the U.S. Army attempted to discharge him from the United States Army Reserve under the gay-exclusionary law known as "don't ask, don't tell" (DADT).

Early life and career
May was born on 29 November 1971 and grew up in a Mormon household in Phoenix, Arizona, in the district he later represented in the state legislature. He is an Eagle Scout. He entered the Naval Reserve Officer Training Corps in 1989 at the age of 17 at Claremont McKenna College and received his commission as a U.S. Army officer in 1993. He served for two and a half years at Fort Riley, Kansas. His assignments included managing the integration of women into an all-male platoon. He left the Army with an honorable discharge in 1995. May ran unsuccessfully for the House in 1996 before winning a seat in 1998, as a Republican. He ran as an openly gay man and had secured the endorsement of the Gay & Lesbian Victory Fund, a political action committee dedicated to helping elect openly LGBT candidates to public office. He and his family have engaged in protracted lawsuits about their competing business interests.

Discharge proceedings under DADT
On February 3, 1999, May spoke to a committee of the Arizona House about pending legislation that would prevent local jurisdictions from providing benefits to the domestic partners of their employees. He said:

A few weeks later, as the Kosovo crisis was developing, he was recalled by the Army Reserves, where he attained the rank of First Lieutenant. He returned to duty in April and in May a local magazine reported on him under the headline "Gay Right Wing Mormon Steve May is a Walking Talking Contradiction". In July the Army notified him that he was under investigation for homosexuality. An Army spokesman commented in August: "I don't think that the individual has been, shall we say, keeping this under wraps, as to his sexual orientation." In March 2000, the Army asked him to resign and he refused. On September 17, 2000, an Army panel recommended May be given an honorable discharge under DADT. May fought to remain in service and in January 2001 the Army terminated its discharge proceedings. May received an honorable discharge in May 2001 at the scheduled conclusion of his term of service.

State legislator
During his time in office, May served as the chairman of the House Ways and Means committee and was instrumental in getting Arizona's sodomy law repealed. In June 2000, May filed suit against the state of Arizona after receiving a parking ticket that included a mandatory 10% surcharge to be paid into a state fund, enacted by referendum in 1998, to provide subsidies to candidates for public office who agreed to certain campaign finance restrictions. May refused to pay the surcharge, claiming it was compelled political speech and an infringement of his rights under the First Amendment of the United States Constitution and also provisions of the Arizona Constitution. The Arizona Supreme Court ruled in 2002 that the surcharge did not violate May's rights.

Later political campaigns
In 2002, May lost his bid for re-election facing two fellow incumbents who were set to run against each other following redistricting pursuant to the 2000 United States Census, by 58 votes. Following the loss, May served as Chief Operating Officer of Wisdom Natural Brands, until retiring in 2008. When Arizona Representative John Shadegg announced his retirement in 2008 May announced plans to run for the seat, but withdrew from the race when Shadegg announced he would seek another term after all.

In 2010, May joined the race for Arizona's 17th District House seat as a write-in candidate. In August, May was one of several Republicans named in a complaint filed by the Arizona Democratic Party, alleging that he conspired to recruit Mill Avenue street people to run as Green Party write-in "sham" candidates to pull votes from Democrats. May acknowledges that he recruited candidates but denies any conspiracy or wrongdoing. District court judge David G. Campbell denied a request from the state Green Party to remove the candidates from the ballot. Following the revelation of a 2009 guilty plea to a charge of driving under the influence of alcohol, for which May served ten days in jail and received three years of probation, May dropped out of the race.

See also

Sexual orientation and the United States military

Notes

1971 births
American military personnel discharged for homosexuality
Gay politicians
LGBT state legislators in Arizona
Don't ask, don't tell
Living people
Republican Party members of the Arizona House of Representatives
United States Army officers
Gay military personnel
Military personnel from Arizona
Politicians from Phoenix, Arizona